Mikhail Mikhajlovich Derzhavin(15 June 1936, Moscow – 10 January 2018, Moscow) was a Soviet and Russian actor.

Biography
Mikhail Mikhajlovich Derzhavin was born in the family of the People's Artist of the RSFSR, who was the leading actor of Vakhtangov’s Theatre, Mikhail Derzhavin and Iraida Derzhavina. He grew up in a house on the Vakhtangov Street, home to numerous actors, artists and musicians. The next entrance was to the  Shchukin Theater School. All children's games were centered on improvised theatrical stage: children staged tales, wrote scripts, assigned roles and were both actors and audience. The famous “Vakhtangovs”, such as Ruben Simonov and Viktor Koltsov, visited Derazhavin's apartment frequently.

After the start of the Great Patriotic War, the Vakhtangov's Theater was evacuated to Omsk. During the evacuation Mikhail Derzhavin attended all performances of his father, but he especially liked "Marshal Kutuzov". At the age of five, Mikhail learned by heart Kutuzov's monologue, and he read it in front of injured in the hospital. In 1954 he entered the Shchukin's Theater School, after he worked at the Lenkom Theatre in 1959. In 1965 he moved to the Theater on Malaya Bronnaya, and since 1968 he worked in the Moscow Theater of Satire. He was a friend and constant partner of Alexander Shirvindt's cabaret since 1957. In the mid-1980s, they hosted the program "Morning Post” together, and beginning in 2013 they hosted "I want to know".

Death
Derzhavin died on 10 January 2018, aged 81, following a long illness. Information about Derzhavin's death was confirmed by his widow, Roksana Babajan.

Family
 Mother – Iraida Ivanovna Derzhavina, actress of Vakhtangov's Theatre.
 Father – Mihail Stepanovich Derzhavin, actor of Vakhtangov's Theatre.
 First wife – Ekaterina Arkad'evna Rajkina, daughter of actor Arkady Raikin
 Second wife – Nina Semjonovna Budjonnaja, daughter of Marshal of the Soviet Union Semyon Budyonny
 Daughter – Marija Mihajlovna Derzhavina (born 1963)
 Grandsons – Peter and Paul
 Third wife – Roksana Rubenovna Babajan (singer)

Selected filmography
 The Artamanov Affair (1941) as Pyotr Artamonov
 They Were the First (1956) as Yevgeny Gorovskoy
 The Dream (1964) as Karl Bryulov
 Three Men in a Boat (1979) as George
 Investigation Held by ZnaToKi (1980) as Valetny
 Winter Evening in Gagra (1985) as episode
 Old Hags (2000) as Secretary of the Communist ideology

Awards
Honored Artist of the RSFSR (1974)
People's Artist of the RSFSR (1989)
Order of Friendship (1996)
Order "For Merit to the Fatherland" IV class (2006)
Order "For Merit to the Fatherland" III class (2011)
 Order of Honour (2017)

References

External links

1936 births
2018 deaths
Male actors from Moscow
Soviet male film actors
Russian male film actors
Soviet male television actors
Russian male television actors
Soviet television presenters
Russian television presenters
Russian male comedians
Soviet male stage actors
Soviet male voice actors
Russian male stage actors
Russian male voice actors
Recipients of the Order "For Merit to the Fatherland", 3rd class
Honored Artists of the RSFSR
Recipients of the Order of Honour (Russia)
People's Artists of the RSFSR
United Russia politicians
Burials at Novodevichy Cemetery